The 79th Massachusetts General Court, consisting of the Massachusetts Senate and the Massachusetts House of Representatives, met in 1858 during the governorship of Nathaniel Prentice Banks. Charles Wentworth Upham served as president of the Senate and Julius Rockwell served as speaker of the House.

Notable legislation included setting a salary of $300 per year for each member of the legislature.

Committees 
 Joint committees: Accounts; Agriculture; Banks and Banking; Claims; Education; Federal Relations; Fisheries; Library; Manufactures; Mercantile Affairs and Insurance; Militia; Parishes and Religious Societies; Prisons; Public Charitable Institutions.
 Senate committees: Bills in the Third Reading; Engrossed Bills; Judiciary; Printing; Probate and Chancery; Treasury.
 House committees: Bills in the Third Reading; County Estimates; Elections; Engrossed Bills; Finance; Judiciary; Leave of Absence; Pay Roll; Printing; Probate and Chancery; Public Buildings.

Senators

Representatives

See also
 35th United States Congress
 List of Massachusetts General Courts

References

Further reading

External links
 
 

Political history of Massachusetts
Massachusetts legislative sessions
massachusetts
1858 in Massachusetts